Stories Since Seventy Nine (abbreviated Stories Since 79 or Ss79) is a Canadian-exclusive EP by the Christian rapper Manafest. It was released independently on September 5, 2012. The EP is technically a side project release and not a regular piece of Manafest's work.

In 2015, the EP was globally released via Manafest's official store for physical and digital purchase, and is no longer exclusive to Canada.

Singles
In July 2013, the track "Overboard" became the first single to be released off the EP.

Track listing

Personnel
Manafest – lead vocals, executive producer
Seth Mosley – producer (on all tracks except 2), background vocals on track 4
Joel Piper – producer (on track 2 only)
Melanie Greenwood – art direction/design

Charts

Music videos

Lyric videos

Notes
The EP is also known as Manafest Presents Stories Since Seventy Nine.
The name of the release is a reference to Greenwood's birth year of 1979.
Most of the songs on the EP were leftover softer pop tracks from Manafest's 2012 album Fighter.
The track "California" speaks about Chris Greenwood's move from Toronto to Los Angeles in 2012.
Though the EP itself was exclusive to Canada for a long length of time, the opening track, "Overboard", was released as a single globally on iTunes on July 9, 2013.
Manafest himself stated the EP was not supposed to originally be exclusive to Canada, but due to legal issues regarding the record it was halted from a release in the United States.
In 2018, Manafest released a second fuller remixed version of "Overboard" on his album Stones Reloaded, a remix project tied to his 2017 release Stones.

References

2012 EPs
Manafest albums
Rap rock EPs